Dance Evolution (known as DanceMasters in North America) is a Japanese dancing video game developed by the makers of the Dance Dance Revolution series. The game was unveiled at Konami's E3 2010 press conference, for Xbox 360 Kinect. The game was released in November 2010. Dance Evolution has 30 tracks, including hip hop, R&B, pop and techno and will be supported with additional songs as downloadable content. An arcade video game port, titled Dance Evolution Arcade, was released on March 27, 2012, in Japan. Although the gameplay remains the same, it has several features that differentiate it with the original version. A spin-off, Rhythm Party (or Boom Boom Dance in Japan), was released on February 1, 2012.

Reception and reviews
Dance Evolution had mixed reviews, according to review aggregator Metacritic. IGN was disappointed in their review of the game saying, "DanceMasters is fun enough, especially if you enjoy Dance Dance Revolution and you want a similar Japanese take on the dance genre...but the niche soundtrack and the lack of a proper practice mode make this game difficult to get into...it's also a shame that the move recognition seems unusually lenient at times, but unnecessarily fickle at others...I would recommend Dance Central over DanceMasters any day of the week.

GameSpot said in their review, "though the novel camera feature fuels some goofy fun, DanceMasters only holds lasting appeal for dedicated dance fiends...you'll probably tire of the game shortly after the novelty of the live action camera wears off...though there are better video game dance opportunities available, heading out onto the floor with DanceMasters is still good for a few kicks. Impulse Gamer rated the game an 8.0 stating, "Dance Evolution is one of the best games available for the Kinect...with shades of Space Channel 5, Dance Evolution requires the player to mimic the dance moves displayed on the screen and then use their body to replicate them...the game is a little daunting at first but once you get the hang of it, Dance Evolution becomes a thoroughly enjoying game.

References

External links
Official DanceMasters (US /canada site)
Official Dance Evolution (Europe site)
Official Dance Evolution (Japanese site)
Official Dance Evolution ARCADE site

2010 video games
Dance video games
Kinect games
Konami games
Video game sequels
Xbox 360 games
Xbox 360-only games
Multiplayer and single-player video games
Video games developed in Japan